Marilyn Jeanne Seely (born July 6, 1940) is an American country music singer, songwriter, and record producer. She also has several acting credits and published a book. Seely found success with the Grammy Award-winning hit "Don't Touch Me" (1966). The song reached the No.2 position on the Billboard country songs chart and is her highest-charting single as a solo artist.  Her soul-inspired vocal delivery was praised by music professionals, who gave her the nickname of "Miss Country Soul". Seely is also known for her membership and presence on the Grand Ole Opry, having appeared more times on the program than any other performer (over 5,000 appearances in her 55-year and ongoing tenure).

Seely was born and raised in northwestern Pennsylvania. Developing an early interest in country music, she performed regularly on local radio and television stations. Following high school graduation, she worked at a local bank before moving to southern California. It was on the west coast where she rediscovered country music. Originally a secretary at Imperial Records, she soon was writing songs for the company as well. Many of these songs would be recorded by other artists. In 1965, she signed her own recording contract with Challenge Records. Seely then moved to Nashville, Tennessee, to pursue a recording career. In Nashville, Seely's "Don't Touch Me" was released on Monument Records and was a major hit single. She followed it with several more hits, including "A Wanderin' Man" (1967) and "I'll Love You More (Than You'll Need)" (1968).

Seely started collaborating with Jack Greene in the late 1960s. The pair toured and had recordings together for several years. Their biggest single would be 1970's "Wish I Didn't Have to Miss You". Seely had solo success during this same time with "Can I Sleep in Your Arms" (1973) and "Lucky Ladies" (1974). In 1977, Seely's career went on hiatus after sustaining severe injuries in an automobile accident. With the support of others, she resumed her career. Seely took a more diverse career approach in the years following her accident. She appeared in the Willie Nelson film Honeysuckle Rose, acted in several stage plays and performed in concert regularly. During this period, Seely also became the first female artist to host the Grand Ole Opry. In addition, she released her first and only book to date, Pieces of a Puzzled Mind.

In the 1990s, Seely returned to recording albums. This was launched with a 1990 eponymous release, followed by her first album of holiday music in 1994 called Number One Christmas. In 1999, she released the studio album Been There...Sung That!, which included duets with several artists. In 2003, Seely issued Life's Highway, a studio album that fused bluegrass with traditional country music. Her most recent studio release was 2020's An American Classic, issued on Curb Records. Seely has since been a consistent performer on the Grand Ole Opry and was the first woman to host the show. She has also been a regular host of a weekly radio program on Sirius XM.

Early life

Seely was born Marilyn Jeanne Seely in Titusville, Pennsylvania, on July 6, 1940. Although born in Titusville, she was raised in nearby Townville, Pennsylvania. Seely was the youngest of four children born to Irene and Leo Seely. Leo Seely was a farmer and an employer of the Titusville Steel Mill. On weekends, he worked at local square dances and played the banjo. Irene Seely was a homemaker who also enjoyed singing with her children while cooking. As a young child, family and friends often gathered together to perform. "It seemed like everybody back in the country played guitars and fiddles, and when we got together there was always pickin‘ and singin‘," Seely recalled. She developed an interest in country music during her early years. On Saturday nights, the Seely family would spend time listening to the Grand Ole Opry in her parents' car. Mrs. Seely also brought her children to country music shows at a local venue named Hillbilly Park. At the park, the family often watched performances by country artists such as Little Jimmy Dickens, Bill Monroe and Jean Shepard.

At age 11, she started performing on a local radio station, located in Meadville, Pennsylvania. Because of her short height and the lack of adjustable microphones, Seely had to stand on top of wooden containers to sing. At age 16, Seely became a regular performer on WICU, a local television station in Erie, Pennsylvania. She recounted being ridiculed by her high school peers in choosing to sing country music. "They all made fun of me because I sang country. I grew up poor and in those days calling someone 'country' was a put-down," she said in 2003. In high school, Seely was a cheerleader and an honors student. In 1958, she graduated from Townville High School at age 18.

Instead of attending college, Seely took a job at the Titusville Trust Company as a stenographer. She was later promoted to a secretarial position. Rather than taking collegiate-level courses, she enrolled at the American Institute of Banking and took night classes. She later reflected that having background knowledge in finance and law helped her better understand the music business. Although Seely was living in Pennsylvania still, she was getting increasingly frustrated by the Pennsylvania winters. One winter day, her car got caught in a snow bank and she was forced to walk home. "I decided right then and there that I was ready to make a change," she recounted on her website.

Music career

1961–1965: Move to California and early songwriting

In 1961, Seely made the decision to move to southern California. She left in her MGA Roadster convertible, along with three other friends. Upon arriving, she found employment at a bank in Beverly Hills, California. However, Seely was more interested in the music business. After a year, she left the job to take a lower-paying secretarial position at Liberty and Imperial Records in Hollywood. While working as a record label secretary, Seely wrote one of her first compositions as a songwriter, "Anyone Who Knows What Love Is (Will Understand)". Accompanying herself on piano, she tracked down writer Randy Newman to help finish the song. It would be picked up by R&B singer Irma Thomas. In 1964, it was released a single and became a major hit on the Billboard pop and R&B charts.

In addition to secretarial work, Seely also worked as a disc jockey for the American Forces Network and appeared on a local California television show called Hollywood Jamboree. She also continued her work as a songwriter. She began writing songs for Four Star Music. As a songwriter, her songs were recorded by several country artists. One of the first vocalists to record a composition was Dottie West who cut the song "It Just Take Practice" for her 1965 album Dottie West Sings. The same year, Connie Smith recorded "Senses" which was co-written with Glen Campbell. It was issued on Smith's studio album Cute 'n' Country. Willie Nelson later recorded "Senses" for his 1970 album Laying My Burdens Down. Her success as a songwriter led to a recording contract with Challenge Records in 1964. Although the label issued three singles between 1964 and 1965, none of the songs received any notable attention. The limited success in California allowed Seely to find other opportunities. Seely had built a friendship with Dottie West. It was West who encouraged her to move to Nashville, Tennessee to further her career. At first, Seely was hesitant about leaving southern California. West then replied with, "Nashville's where you learn." Country songwriter Hank Cochran was also impressed by her musicianship and also encouraged a Nashville move.

1966–1968: "Don't Touch Me" and breakthrough
In 1965, Seely officially moved to Nashville. "When I  arrived in town,  I only had  $50 and a Ford Falcon  to my name," Seely recalled on her official website biography. Once arriving, she attended the 1965 DJ Convention and found Hank Cochran at the event. Seely approached him saying, "Well I'm here! Do you still want to work with me?" Cochran replied, "Yes, if you're going to let me make the decisions and do what I know is best for you." Seely agreed and shortly afterward, she got a position on Porter Wagoner's road and television show, replacing female artist Norma Jean. While on the show, Seely searched for recording labels. However, she found little success in finding any labels interested in signing her. Finally, Monument Records, offered her a recording contract in 1966 and she remained at the label for several years. Seely recorded Cochran's newly composed "Don't Touch Me" shortly after signing. Originally, Buck Owens had interest in recording it but Cochran declined, giving it to Seely instead. Cochran and Seely's relationship would also turn romantic during this period and they would marry before the decade's end.

"Don't Touch Me" was released as a single in March 1966 and became a major hit. By June 1966, the single reached number 2 on the Billboard Hot Country Singles chart. In addition, the song crossed over to the Billboard Hot 100 where it reached a peak of number 85. The song's success prompted the release of her debut studio album, The Seely Style. Released in September 1966, the album peaked at number eight on the Billboard Top Country Albums list and was her highest-charting album. "Don't Touch Me" also brought several awards to Seely. She later won the Best Female Country Vocal Performance accolade at the 9th Annual Grammy Awards. Seely was also invited to become a member of the Grand Ole Opry in 1967. "Don't Touch Me" would be Seely's biggest hit and signature song as a recording artist.

Music journalists and writers have since commented on "Don't Touch Me". Writers Mary Bufwack and Robert K. Oermann called it "a throbbing song of unfilled passion". They also praised Seely's vocal delivery of the tune calling her performance to have "aching conviction". Critic Robert Christgau gave the song a positive response as well, praising its message for women's sexuality. Brian Mansfield of Allmusic called the song a "great record" in his review of Seely's 1993 compilation Greatest Hits on Monument. Ace Collins would later comment on the song's notoriety in his book, The Stories Behind Country Music’s All-Time Greatest 100 Songs. "Cochran‘s  ̳Don‘t Touch Me‘has stood the test of time like few other works.  Hauntingly beautiful, poetry set to meter, this composition merits particular praise for the exquisite manner in which it relates its story of love, doubt, and commitment," he wrote.

Seely had success in further releases for the Monument label. Her follow-up to "Don't Touch Me" also became a major hit. The song, "It's Only Love", reached the top 20 of the Billboard country singles chart in October 1966. In March 1967, Monument issued her second studio album entitled, Thanks, Hank!. The album was a collection of tracks written by Hank Cochran, who had been writing much of her material by this point. Greg Adams of Allmusic considered Seely's voice to be more comparable to that of pop rather than country. Nonetheless, he gave the record three out of five stars. The album's lead single, "A Wanderin' Man", reached number 13 on the Billboard country list in February 1967, becoming her third major hit. Seely had a second top ten hit with the single "I'll Love You More (Than You'll Need)" in early 1968. The song, also written by Cochran, prompted the release of her third studio album in February 1968. The demand for Seely's public appearances also increased during this time. She toured for extensive periods of time, often traveling from coast to coast. The heavy schedule caused for Seely to leave Porter Wagoner's show and he replaced her with Dolly Parton. Instead of appearing with Wagoner, she worked regularly with country artist Ernest Tubb and appeared on his syndicated television show.

1969–1977: Move to Decca Records, Jack Greene duets and solo hits
In 1969, Seely left Monument and switched to Decca Records. She was now working with producer Owen Bradley, who produced her eponymous studio album the same year. Among its tracks was the song "Just Enough to Start Me Dreamin'", which was released as a radio single. Around this period, she made regular appearances on television programs including Hee Haw and The Glen Campbell Goodtime Hour. Seely also toured overseas entertaining the American military. She traveled to areas including Japan, Taiwan and Thailand. Upon returning from her overseas military tour, Seely realized during an Opry performance that there was no U.S. flag, a patriotic symbol that she was accustomed to seeing. She noted the flag's absence to the Opry manager. There has been an American flag displayed on the Grand Ole Opry stage since then.

In addition to a solo career at Decca, Seely collaborated with country artist Jack Greene. Their first release together was the single "Wish I Didn't Have to Miss You". A commercial success, the song reached number two on the Billboard country singles chart in early 1970. The song prompted their first studio album to be issued in January 1970, which reached number 18 on the country albums list. The pair later released another studio album in 1972 entitled Two for the Show. It included two singles, starting with 1971's "Much Oblige", which became a top twenty country hit. Greene and Seely's duet success led to the creation of their own traveling road show from 1969 to 1972. The duo toured and performed at venues ranging from Madison Square Garden in New York City to Wembley Stadium in London. Their concerts and recording would receive recognition from several award programs. They were nominated by the Grammy Awards in 1970 and were nominated four times for the Country Music Association's "Vocal Duo of the Year" between 1972 and 1975.

In the early 1970s, Seely's solo recordings had declined at radio. Her sixth studio album, Please Be My New Love (1970), did not receive a Billboard placement. Further singles reached lower positions on the Billboard country songs chart during this time. Singles such as "Tell Me Again" (1970) and the self-composed "Farm in Pennsyltucky" (1972) did not peak past the top 50. While not achieving any solo achievements, Seely's songwriting was more successful. In 1972, she composed "Leavin' and Sayin' Goodbye", which was recorded by Faron Young. Released as a single, it became a major hit when it reached number nine on the country chart. Other country artists recorded her compositions during the 1970s. Among these performers was Ernest Tubb who recorded "Sometimes I Do". It was released as a single via First Generation Records in 1977. Merle Haggard recorded "Life of a Rodeo Cowboy" in 1978. Seely later called it a "great compliment" to have Haggard cut the track.

Seely returned to the popularity charts with solo success in 1973. Hank Cochran had reworked the traditional tune, "May I Sleep in Your Barn Tonight" to the country song, "Can I Sleep in Your Arms". Released as a single, it became Seely's biggest solo hit in several years when it peaked at number six on the Billboard country songs list. Cochran had also reworked the Appalachian song, "Come All You Fair and Tender Ladies", to the title of "Lucky Ladies". It also became a major hit, peaking at number 11 on the country songs chart in February 1974. Her ninth studio album, Can I Sleep in Your Arms/Lucky Ladies would be released in late 1973 and reached number 15 on the Top Country Albums chart. Seely then moved to Columbia Records where she recorded for several years. Some music writers noticed a change in her material while at Columbia. Mary Bufwack and Robert K. Oermann called Seely's Columbia recordings to be "spicy" and "franker" than her previous work, highlighting the hits "Take Me to Bed" and "We're Still in Hangin' in There Ain't We Jessi". The latter tune documented the marital conflicts of several female country artists including Jessi Colter and Dottie West. In addition, "Take Me to Bed" would be her last single to date to make a Billboard chart appearance.

1977–1989: Car accident and career obstacles
In June 1977, Seely was involved in a car accident in Goodlettsville, Tennessee, a suburb outside of Nashville. Seely had been driving her vehicle when it crashed into a tree. She was admitted to Nashville Memorial Hospital where she was reported to be in "fair condition". Among her injuries, Seely suffered a fractured jaw, broken ribs, a punctured lung and a collapsed lung. Upon arriving at the hospital she was given same-day surgery to repair her lung. Seely eventually recovered from her injuries and later reflected on her appreciation for her life. "You know, it sounds like a cliche, but it's true that your perspective changes when you have a close call, what you took for granted you come to appreciate more," Seely commented on her official website biography. She later would credit friend Dottie West for her support during her recovery. "Dottie was there as much as she possibly could be, helping me through that time. After I got out of the hospital and was homebound, one time, she drove me out to her place just for a change of scenery," she commented in 2016.

Following her recovery, Seely returned to performing but was no longer signed to a recording label. It became more challenging for Seely to tour due to fewer concert engagements. "The only bright spot in my life right now is a flashing neon sign...and even that comes and goes," she stated. When opportunities were available, Seely continued to work. Among her first major engagements was a tour with Willie Nelson. Her appearances with Nelson led to a collaboration on the soundtrack album for his film Honeysuckle Rose (1980). Along with Hank Cochran and Nelson, she performed a collaborative version of the song "Make the World Go Away" for the soundtrack. In 1982, Jack Greene reunited for a studio album containing re-recordings of their previous hits. Seely also looked for other music-related opportunities. In 1985, she opened up a nightclub in Nashville named "Jeannie Seely's Country Club". Among the venue's major events was a premier music party hosted by Seely on its opening in June 1985. However, in 1986 the club closed down after only a year of being open to the public.

In 1981, Seely became the first female to be a Grand Ole Opry host when Del Reeves was stuck in a snowstorm and she was asked to fill in for him. The Opry continued to only use male artists as show hosts. However, after advocating for several years of fairer representation, Seely became the first female member to regularly host Opry segments. Seely would also be a recurrent host of The Nashville Network's Opry Backstage show, where she interviewed artists following their Opry performances. Along with the Opry, Seely also appeared on several other network programs during this time. This included appearances on Nashville Now, Crook & Chase, Family Feud and Prime Time Country.

1990–present: Return to recording
Seely returned to a more active music career in the 1990s. In 1990, she released her eleventh studio album, which was issued on her own recording label. In 1993, she appeared alongside Stonewall Jackson in the music video for "Trashy Women", a song by the band Confederate Railroad. When released as a single, the song reached number ten on the Billboard country songs chart. The following year, her first album of holiday music was released called Number One Christmas. While not recording or touring, Seely maintained an active presence as a Grand Ole Opry member. She also continued making regular appearances on The Nashville Network. Seely's songwriting was also a part of her music career in the 90s. In 1997, Lorrie Morgan recorded "I've Enjoyed as Much of This as I Can Stand", which was composed with Bill Anderson. Morgan's version was released on her 1997 studio album, Shakin' Things Up. Before the end of the decade, Seely released her thirteenth studio effort, Been There...Sung That! (1999). The project was self-produced and featured duets with T. Graham Brown and Willie Nelson.

In the early 2000s, Seely turned her attention towards bluegrass projects. In 2001, she sang alongside Ralph Stanley on his studio album Clinch Mountain Sweethearts. On the album, they performed the track "I'm Ready to Go". Seely followed this in 2003 with the studio album Life's Highway. The record's bluegrass and acoustic sounds received positive reviews from critics. John Lupton of Country Standard Time called it an album "chock-full of top level bluegrass talent." Lupton also praised Seely's vocal performance on the album, calling it "classic country" and "timeless". Bob Mitchell of the Louisville Music News gave the album mostly a positive response. "Overall, this recording lacks the earthy intensity and drive that characterizes authentic traditional Bluegrass. But, make no mistake, Life's Highway is enjoyable and features some of country and bluegrass's finest musicians," he wrote.

In the late 2000s, Seely continued an active touring schedule. During several summers, she held concerts at the Dollywood theme park and toured in Ireland. While taking time to tour, Seely also found time to record her fifteenth studio album. In 2011, Vintage Country: Old But Treasured was released on her latest label, Cheyenne Records. "...like I always joke onstage, I’m speaking about the music when I say old but treasured," Seely commented in a 2011 interview. The album was a collection of country music standards previously recorded by others. Among its songs was Bobbie Gentry's "Ode to Billie Joe" and Billy Walker's "Funny How Time Slips Away".

During the 2010s, Seely's touring schedule remained busy as she performed at events including the CMA Music Festival and the R.O.P.E.'s "Summer Spectacular" show. Since 2016, Seely has also been the host of the "Dottie West Birthday Bash", which is held every October in honor of West. The event supports the Nashville Musicians Relief Fund. She returned to recording with her sixteenth studio album, Written in Song (2017). All fourteen of the album's tracks were composed by Seely and many were first recorded by other artists. Markos Papadatos of the Digital Journal gave the album an "A" rating in his review. "Overall, Jeannie Seely soars on her new album, Written in Song. "Miss Country Soul" is back stronger than ever. There is a variety on her latest musical effort."

In late 2019, Seely announced her seventeenth studio recording called An American Classic. It was produced by Don Cusic and released on Curb Records on August 14, 2020.

Acting and other contributions

Seely also several credits as an actress. Most of her acting roles have occurred at the theatrical level. Her first acting role was in the country music-themed musical, Takin' It Home (1986). Seely played alongside Lorrie Morgan and Jean Shepard during the show's run. In 1988, she portrayed the character of Miss Mona in the musical, The Best Little Whorehouse in Texas. Seely performed as part of the cast during its run in Nashville, Tennessee. In 1990, Seely performed in the play, Everybody Loves Opal, her first straight acting role. During rehearsal, she broke two of her ribs but still performed for the show's duration at a Nashville dinner theater. In 2001, Seely played alongside artist Terri Williams in the musical Always Patsy Cline. The show chronicled the friendship between Patsy Cline and Louise Seger. In the program, Seely played the role of Seger.

In 2005, Seely performed at Nashville’s Belcourt Theatre in a production of The Vagina Monologues. She performed alongside fellow artists Kathy Mattea and Pam Tillis. "I've had a couple people tell me, 'Only you'd have the guts to do that. I guess it takes a little courage in some ways, but to me it's something that needs to be done. I'm not really an actress, I'm just acting like one," Seely commented in 2005. Between 2004 and 2007, she starred in the musical, Could It Be Love, including a performance at Nashville's Ryman Auditorium. Seely portrayed an older theater actress that wanted to put on a senior citizen version of Grease. Also in the show was country artist Helen Cornelius. In a 2005 interview, the show's creator commented on whether he deliberately chose Seely and Cornelius. "Anyone who sees the show and knows the two of them would swear I did. Helen plays a devout Christian woman, and Jeannie plays a woman who is more, shall we say, morally diverse," he said. According to a 2007 interview with Seely, she enjoyed acting in the show. "We have a lot of fun with it and I think the music is absolutely wonderful!! I hope everybody will enjoy it, I think they will. We have fun with it," she commented.

In 2002, Seely played a minor role in the film Changing Hearts, which starred Faye Dunaway. The film also included Jan Howard and Rita Coolidge in the cast.

Seely has also taken up other interests. In 1988, she published a book called Pieces of a Puzzled Mind. The book was a collection of witticisms Seely had written over the years. According to Seely, many of the witticisms began as song titles that never materialized. Other quotes were originally opening lines Seely used while performing on stage. Quotes in the book included, "Of course I want you for your body. I’ve got a mind of my own" or "An ex-husband is one mistake you don’t have to live with." The book was originally self-published and has since been re-printed.

In 2018, it was announced that Seely would join Willie Nelson's Sirius XM radio series, Willie's Roadhouse. Her segment is titled "Sunday's with Seely". The show has since been airing every Sunday from noon to 4 pm. "The only thing better than being able to play classic country music is to be able to do it at Willie’s Roadhouse. I’m so excited to be a part of the SiriusXM family and play the music of my peers!" Seely commented. During her segment, Seely shares personal stories from her memories in Nashville and also plays songs by classic country artists.

Personal life

Seely has been married twice. In 1969, she married her Nashville songwriter Hank Cochran. Seely respected Cochran's songwriting and legacy to the country music in community. In a 2012 interview, she spoke of Cochran's impact. "Hank was one of the writers who laid the groundwork for Music City, for writing songs that encompassed any genre of music. When you think of his songs, they could be written today," she commented. According to a 1981 article, the pair began to live separately from one another several years prior to divorcing. In 1981, the couple officially filed for divorce, but continued to remain friendly over the years. In 2010, Cochran passed away from cancer at the age of 74.

In 2010, Seely married Nashville attorney Gene Ward. The couple live together in a home alongside the Cumberland River in Nashville. In 2018, Seely cancelled several engagements after Ward became ill. Ward was rushed to the hospital shortly before Seely was scheduled to make a Grand Ole Opry appearance. She later posted updates about Ward's condition on her social media sites. "His vitals are holding pretty steady and his breathing is much improved. Still can’t have water, which is heart wrenching to hear him ask. Has days and nights turned around so he’s resting right now," she wrote. Ward recovered from the illness and the couple renewed their wedding vows in 2019. The couple renewed their vows at sea on a country music cruise. She later spoke about the ceremony. "The reason Gene and I wanted to renew our vows is because first of all, we can...I thought it might be nice for them [her fans] to see Gene standing up there looking so sharp in his suit," Seely commented.

Seely's home was destroyed in the 2010 Tennessee floods. As the water started to rise in her neighborhood, Seely and her husband escaped in a pickup truck, leaving valuables behind. Seely lost most possessions in her home after three feet of water had damaged the inside. "You can either laugh about it or you can cry, and I don't feel like crying," she said in a performance shortly after losing her home. Seely credited the help of local volunteers with putting her home back together a year later. "Just about that time, there was a group of young people from Hardin Valley, just this side of Knoxville, who were supposed to go to Jamaica but couldn't because there was too much violence there. So, they came here, and what a difference that group made. Those young people hit this place like a swarm of bees, they were cutting the weeds that were starting to grow, trimming the shrubbery, hauling out trash, digging up where the water had settled in the mulch," she said in a 2011 interview.

On July 4th, 2022, Jeannie and Eugene were Grand Marshals of the annual parade in Eugene's hometown of White Pine, Tennessee.

Seely celebrated her 55th anniversary with the Grand Ole Opry in September 2022. She noted that she had begun appearing on the show when cast membership required appearing on at least half of the Opry's appearances each year, and that her loyalty to the program prompted her to attempt to maintain a pace far more frequent than required after the rules were relaxed later on. This, along with the increase in the number of episodes per week the Opry has staged, accounted for her record number of appearances on the program.

Artistry

Musical styles and voice
Seely's musical style is mostly rooted in country music. However, it also is rooted in classic country, country pop and blue-eyed soul. At times, her songs have dealt with women's sexuality, heartache, empowerment and loss. The Boot writer Carrie Horton explained that Seely was a pioneer for women's sexual freedom. Horton noted that Seely's signature tune, "Don't Touch Me", was controversial due to its lyric. "'Don't Touch Me' caused quite a stir upon its release as one of the first country songs featuring a woman expressing sexual desire. Proving that women can sing about sex too..." Horton also explained that her material could be considered classic country. Songs such as "Can I Sleep in Your Arms" and "A Wanderin' Man" fused "honky tonk" and "traditional country" with modern arrangements, according to Horton. Seely has frequently been nicknamed "Miss Country Soul" for her stylistic choices related to the blue-eyed soul genre. In a 2017 interview, Seely explained how she acquired the nickname. "...as I left the radio station he’d visited, the disc jockey played my record 'Don’t Touch Me' and he back-announced it saying ‘that’s the blue-eyed soul of Miss Country Soul Jeannie Seely’ and Ed [Hamilton] really liked the sound and the feel of that and it so it kinda stuck," she commented.

Seely has been influenced mostly by artists in the country music genre. She noted that Patsy Cline, Jean Shepard and Kitty Wells all were important female inspirations. She also cited Little Jimmy Dickens and Ernest Tubb as influences. Seely also said that she was inspired by Rosemary Clooney and Patti Page as a young child.

Seely's voice has also been of interest to writers and critics when discussing her artistry. Some writers have noted the emotion in her vocal delivery. Ken Burns of PBS called Seely's voice "emotion packed" in his biography of her music and career. John Lupton of Country Standard Time called her voice "distinctive and raspy". Mary Bufwack and Robert K. Oermann considered Seely to be an example of the "heartache/victim singers" of the 1960s and 1970s. Bufwack and Oermann compared her voice to that of Connie Smith, Dottie West and Tammy Wynette. "Jeannie's husky cigarette-stained voice moaned with such agony that she was dubbed 'Miss Country Soul'", they wrote. Other journalists had differed opinions. Greg Adams of Allmusic considered her voice to resemble that of a "pop-oriented" singer rather than country. Nonetheless, he still considered her voice to be country. "...today she seems like Kitty Wells compared to some of the pure pop that has since passed for country," Adams wrote.

Image
As a performer and entertainer, Seely's image has often been a subject of discussion. On the Grand Ole Opry, she became the first artist to wear a miniskirt on stage. Seely challenged Opry manager Ott Devine, who disliked the idea of her wearing a miniskirt onstage. "Okay, this is what America is wearing and I’ll make you a deal. I won’t wear a miniskirt in the back door if you don’t let anybody wear one in the front door," she recounted in Ken Burns’ Country Music documentary. Seely was also among the first female artists to wear other contemporary fashion items, including go-go boots, pantsuits and denim jeans. Prior to Seely, many female country performers entertained in gingham and wore dresses on stage. According to Mary Bufwack and Robert K. Oermann, Seely "broke the Opry's gingham curtain". Seely later reflected on her choice of stage attire. "I never planned to set any sort of trend. I'm about like any other normal American girl my age. I think I dress and act pretty much the way she does," she recalled.

Legacy

Seely has been described as an influential female country artist. According to authors Mary Bufwack and Robert K. Oermann, Seely's stage presence and personality was unlike that of her predecessors. "When she arrived in Nashville in 1965, women were still expected to portray the submissive country sweetheart. Jeannie blazed a nonconformist trail from the moment she hit the Opry stage in her mini skirt." Carrie Horton of The Boot called her career "prolific" and "influential". "From her success as a songwriter to her popularity as a duet partner to her influence as a solo artist, Seely's work has impacted generations of country, Americana and bluegrass performers," Horton commented. Kevin John Coyne of Country Universe called her, "one of the most forceful personalities on the country music scene since she had her first big hit in 1966." Edward Morris of Country Music Television called her "one of the Opry’s most applauded performers."

Her music has also been an influence on other female country artists. Lorrie Morgan has considered Seely to be influence on her music. In a 2017 interview, Morgan called her "a great lady and a very good friend of mine." Barbara Mandrell has also cited her as an influence. Carly Pearce is a third female artist that has sought inspiration from Seely. "I dreamt of singing in the Grand Ole Opry my whole life. They are so dear to me, and I hope to be a member one day. Be like Jeannie – she's kind of my inspiration as far as the Opry goes," Pearce commented.

In recent years, Seely has received honors for her accomplishments as a recording artist and writer. Her hometown of Townville, Pennsylvania has made her a "Grand Marshall" of their community parades on several occasions. In 2017, Seely celebrated 50 years as a member of the Grand Ole Opry. She was among several women who have since been a member for 50 years. Among those have been Loretta Lynn and Dolly Parton. "The Opry has been my life for more than 50 years. I feel so blessed to be a part of this Opry family. Tonight was just the icing on the cake," she commented in 2017. The same year, Seely was recognized for her life's work at 7th annual "NATD Honors Gala", along with Charley Pride.

In 2018, Seely received a star on the Music City Walk of Fame. Also in 2018, she received an award from Billboard magazine for the composition, "Anyone Who Know What Love Is (Will Understand)". The song reached number 2 on the "Top TV Songs" chart after its appearance in the show Black Mirror. She was featured in Ken Burns's documentary Country Music in September 2019. Seely's music and career was profiled and she was also interviewed for several segments. In late 2019, she received an honorary degree from Lincoln Memorial University in Tennessee. "This is an honor that exceeds even my dreams. I could never have imagined this. I hope that I can always be deserving of this title in all that I do," she commented in her acceptance speech. Between March 2019 and February 2020, artifacts from Seely's life and career were on display at the Country Music Hall of Fame and Museum. Titled, "American Currents", her life and career was beside the work of newer Nashville artists, most notably Carly Pearce.

Discography

Studio albums
 The Seely Style (1966)
 Thanks, Hank! (1967)
 I'll Love You More (1968)
 Little Things (1968)
 Jeannie Seely (1969)
 Jack Greene, Jeannie Seely  (1970)
 Please Be My New Love (1970)
 Two for the Show  (1972)
 Can I Sleep in Your Arms/Lucky Ladies (1973)
 Greatest Hits  (1982)
 Jeannie Seely (1990)
 Number One Christmas (1994)
 Been There...Sung That! (1999)
 Life's Highway (2003)
 Vintage Country: Old But Treasured (2011)
 Written in Song (2017)
 An American Classic (2020)

Acting credits

Filmography

Stage productions

Awards and nominations

!
|-
| rowspan="3"| 1966
| Billboard
| Most Promising Female Country Artist
| 
| 
|-
| Cashbox
| Most Promising Female Country Artist
| 
| 
|-
| Record World
| Most Promising Female Country Artist
| 
| 
|-
| rowspan="2"| 1967
| Grand Ole Opry
| Inducted as 138th member 
| 
| 
|-
| rowspan="2"| Grammy Awards
| Best Female Country Vocal Performance – "Don't Touch Me"
| 
| 
|-
| 1970
| Best Country Performance by a Duo or Group with Vocal – "Wish I Didn't Have to Miss You"
| 
| 
|-
| 1972
| rowspan="4"| Country Music Association Awards
| rowspan="4"| Vocal Duo of the Year 
| 
| 
|-
| 1973
| 
| 
|-
| 1974
| 
| 
|-
| 1975
| 
| 
|-
| 2000
| North America Country Music Hall of Fame
| Inducted
| 
| 
|-
| rowspan="2"| 2002
| Grammy Awards
| Best Bluegrass Album – Clinch Mountain Sweethearts
| 
| 
|-
| International Bluegrass Music Awards
| Recorded Event of the Year – Clinch Mountain Sweethearts
| 
| 
|-
| 2006
| rowspan="2"| R.O.P.E. Awards
| Songwriter of the Year
| 
|
|-
| 2007
| Entertainer of the Year
| 
| 
|-
| 2018
| Music City Walk of Fame
| Inducted as a member
| 
| 
|-
| rowspan="3"| 2019
| Inaugural Influencing Women Awards Gala
| Standing Ovation Award
| 
| 
|-
| Lincoln Memorial University
| Honorary Doctorate
| 
| 
|-
| R.O.P.E. Awards
| D.J. of the Year
| 
| 
|-
|}

Books
 Pieces of a Puzzled Mind (1988)

References

Sources

External links

 
 Jeannie Seely profile at Country Music Cruise
 Jeannie Seely songwriting compositions at Second Hand Songs

1940 births
Living people
20th-century American singers
20th-century American writers
21st-century American singers
American country singer-songwriters
American women country singers
Challenge Records artists
Columbia Records artists
Country musicians from Pennsylvania
Record producers from Pennsylvania
People from Titusville, Pennsylvania
Singer-songwriters from Pennsylvania
Decca Records artists
Grammy Award winners
Grand Ole Opry members
MCA Records artists
Monument Records artists
20th-century American women singers
21st-century American women singers